Pyrrhic Victory is the third studio album by Dutch band Intwine. It was released on October 9, 2006 by V2.

Track listing
"Jack in a Box" – 4:57
"Solo" – 3:33
"Cut Me Loose" – 4:41
"Cookie Jar" – 3:55
"Feel It" – 3:04
"For Goodness Sake" – 5:09
"Foolishly" – 5:18
"One Thing" – 3:40
"So Long" – 4:05
"Coco Song" – 5:38
"Abyss" – 3:50
"Glory" – 4:48

Bonus DVD
Live Stuff
Interview
"Not an Addict" Live (Vrienden van Amstel feat. Sarah Bettens)
Rumshop Sessions Aruba ("Raven Claw")
8 Min of Utter Bullshit
Making of "Feel It"

Personnel
Roger Peterson – vocals
Jacob Streefkerk – guitar
Touché Eusebius – bass guitar
Jon Symons – guitar  
Rocheteau Mahuwallan – drums
Gordon Groothedde – production

2006 albums
Intwine albums
V2 Records albums